Óscar Antonio Aguilera Valdés :es:Óscar Aguilera (born 11 March 1935) is a Paraguayan football forward who played for Paraguay in the 1958 FIFA World Cup. He also played for Club Olimpia.

References

External links

1935 births
Paraguayan footballers
Paraguay international footballers
Association football forwards
Club Olimpia footballers
1958 FIFA World Cup players
Living people